Aurdal Church is a parish church of the Church of Norway in Nord-Aurdal Municipality in Innlandet county, Norway. It is located in the village of Aurdal. It is the church for the Aurdal parish which is part of the Valdres prosti (deanery) in the Diocese of Hamar. The white, wooden church was built in a cruciform design in 1736 using plans drawn up by the architect Svend Tråseth. The church seats about 250 people.

History
The earliest existing historical records of the church date back to the year 1327, but the church was not built that year. The first church in Aurdal was a wooden stave church that was likely built during the 12th century (a baptismal font in the church has been dated to the years 1150–1200, so that is likely the time the church was first built). As early as 1665, there were plans for replacing the old stave church, but they were not acted upon for some time. Svend Tråseth was hired to design and build the new church. The old church was torn down in 1735 and construction of the new church took place in 1735–1736 on the same site as the old church. The new church was a wooden cruciform building with a central tower. The new building was consecrated on 22 February 1737 by the parish priest Peter Abelsted.

In 1814, this church served as an election church. Together with more than 300 other parish churches across Norway, it was a polling station for elections to the 1814 Norwegian Constituent Assembly which wrote the Constitution of Norway. This was Norway's first national elections. Each church parish was a constituency that elected people called "electors" who later met together in each county to elect the representatives for the assembly that was to meet in Eidsvoll later that year.

In 1866, major structural repairs were carried out on the church tower and the foundation wall. In 1892, the church underwent a comprehensive repair which included the construction of a sacristy that was built on the east end of the choir which was in the eastern cross-arm.

Media gallery

See also
List of churches in Hamar

References

Nord-Aurdal
Churches in Innlandet
Cruciform churches in Norway
Wooden churches in Norway
18th-century Church of Norway church buildings
Churches completed in 1736
12th-century establishments in Norway
Norwegian election church